Fabio Di Tomaso (born April 9, 1977 in Quebec, Montreal, Canada) he is a Canadian actor.

Biography 
Fabio Di Tomaso was born into a family of Argentine origin. He spent his childhood and adolescence in the town of Boulogne Sur Mer next to his mother. At 16 he expressed his interest in musical bands and decided to venture into the world of music. Later, he studied theater and had several jobs. He did the CBC on economics but a month later he confessed to a friend that he wanted to do theater.

Personal life 
From 2004 to 2012, Fabio Di Tomaso was in a relationship with the actress, Melina Petriella. In 2016, Fabio Di Tomaso meet Samira Sufan, film producer. In 2017, they get married. In January 2018 the couple's first child, a boy, was born whom, they called Fidel Di Tomaso. The couple divorced in 2019 after almost two years of marriage. They both share custody of their son.

Career

Acting career 
Fabio Di Tomaso began his career in the movie Bajo bandera in 1997. In 2001, he was part of the cast of the television series Yago, pasión morena. In 2003, he was part of the cast of the television series Resistiré. In 2004, he was part of the cast of the television series Padre Coraje. From 2004 to 2005, he was the protagonist of the youth television series Floricienta with Florencia Bertotti, Juan Gil Navarro, Isabel Macedo and Benjamín Rojas. In 2006, he was part of the cast of the television series Juanita, la soltera. In 2008, he was part of the cast of the television series Vidas robadas. In 2009, he was part of the cast of the movie Cartas para Jenny. In 2010, he was part of the cast of the youth television series Consentidos. In 2010, he was part of the cast the movie Plumíferos. In 2012, he was part of the cast of the miniseries Volver a nacer. From 2012 to 2013, he was part of the cast of the television series Dulce Amor. In 2014, he was part of the cast of the television series Somos familia. In 2014, he was part of the cast of the television series Camino al Amor. In 2015, he was part of the cast of the miniseries El mal menor. In 2017, he was part of the cast of the television series Cuéntame cómo pasó. In 2017, he was part of the cast of the movie Soldado argentino solo conocido por Dios. In 2019, he makes a special participation in Pequeña Victoria. In 2020, he was part of the cast of the television series Separadas.

Musical career 
Fabio Di Tomaso was part of the musical band "Poketers" beside Sebastián Rubio, Santiago Prado and Luciano Iriarte.

Filmography

Movies

Television

Discography

Soundtrack albums 

 2005 — Floricienta

References

External links 

1977 births
Living people
Argentine male film actors
Argentine male television actors